Slow Motion may refer to:

Film
 Slow motion, a filmmaking effect
 Slow Motion (1979 film), a Croatian film directed by Vanča Kljaković
 Slow Motion (1980 film) or Every Man for Himself, a film by Jean-Luc Godard

Music

Albums
 Slow Motion (Man album), 1974
 Slow Motion (Supertramp album), or the title song, 2002
 Slomotion, or the title song, by The Watchmen, 2001
 Slow Motion, an EP by Jarren Benton, 2015

Songs
 "Slow Motion" (Color Me Badd song), 1992
 "Slow Motion" (Hosokawa), a composition for accordion by Toshio Hosokawa, 2002
 "Slow Motion" (Juvenile song), 2004
 "Slow Motion" (Lee.M and J. Pearl song), 2012
 "Slow Motion" (Leila K song), 1993
 "Slow Motion" (Trey Songz song), 2015
 "Slo-Mo-Tion", by Marilyn Manson, 2012
 "Slow Motion (Pt. 1)", by Johnny Williams, 1973
 "Slow Motion", by Big & Rich from Comin' to Your City
 "Slow Motion", by Blondie from Eat to the Beat
 "Slow Motion", by David Gray from Life in Slow Motion
 "Slow Motion", by Gerald Alston, 1990
 "Slow Motion", by Juliana Hatfield from Beautiful Creature
 "Slow Motion", by Kylie Minogue from Body Language
 "Slow Motion", by Nickelback from The Long Road
 "Slow Motion", by Saint Motel from Saintmotelevision
 "Slow Motion", by Shreya Ghoshal and Nakash Aziz from the film Bharat
 "Slow Motion", by Simple Plan from Harder Than It Looks, 2022
 "Slow Motion", by Slander and Bret James
 "Slow Motion", by The Sweet
 "Slow Motion", by Third Eye Blind from Blue
 "Slow Motion", by Ultravox from Systems of Romance
 "Slow Motion", a 2018 song by Randolph featuring KSI

See also
 Slow-motion approximation, in physics, an approximation used in relativistic mechanics
 Slow movement (disambiguation)